The first Tymoshenko Government was appointed on February 4, 2005 by 373 Parliamentarians of the Verkhovna Rada (Ukrainian Parliament). It was supported (also by) opposition factions' Parliamentarians, including three Communists, 18 Social Democratic Party of Ukraine (united) members, 46 Regions faction members.

On September 8, 2005, Ukrainian President Viktor Yushchenko sacked the entire government after both Deputy Prime Minister Mykola Tomenko and presidential chief of staff Oleksandr Zinchenko spoke out that the government was "riddled with corruption".

Creation

Government program "Towards the people"

Composition

Key economic achievements of Tymoshenko’s government

Increased salaries, pensions, scholarships;

Fulfilled one of the paragraphs of social program from Yushchenko's election agenda on support for new families: in 2005 a social aid for a newborn child was increased 12 times;

“Contraband stop” campaign was launched. The campaign was accompanied by eradication of shadow schemes in business;

Call for nationalization and re-privatization of more than 3000 enterprises. Eventually the government nationalized and then re-privatized country's biggest metallurgical plant “Kryvorizhstal”. In October 2005 it was sold for $4 billion to a new owner, which was an impressive amount compared to $8.5 billion received by the government from privatization between 1991 and 2004;

On June 16, 2005 president Viktor Yushchenko, speaker of the Verkhovna Rada Volodymyr Lytvyn and Yulia Tymoshenko signed a memorandum on guarantees of ownership rights and ensuring lawfulness for their implementation. According to Yushchenko, “Ukrainian government brought  murky privatization practice to the end”;

Reaction to crises on internal market

In April–May 2005 Ukraine faced so called “meat, sugar and petrol crises” when prices for the abovementioned products went up by 30-50% over a couple of weeks. These crises allegedly resulted from a cartel conspiracy and it took Tymoshenko's government about 1.5 months to get the prices down to the initial level with the help of “goods intervention” mechanism;

The meat crisis was caused by increased demand for meat as a result of increased salaries. Tymoshenko's government lifted duties on imported meat, which dropped the speculative prices Tymoshenko's political opponents (Yushchenko and Yanukovych) kept criticizing her for importing “low quality meat”. At that time Tymoshenko's government made a decision to increase production of poultry, which eventually made Ukraine a poultry exporter.

The sugar and petrol crises were caused by a “cartel conspiracy” which increased prices for the abovementioned goods by 30-50%. Tymoshenko's government organized importation of cane sugar and dropped duties on imported oil products. In a couple of months the prices stabilized. In 2006 the Anti-Monopoly Committee, who investigated the “sugar crisis” issued a conclusion which said that it was a cartel monopoly with a participation of Petro Poroshenko, then-head of the National Council of Security and Defense.

In May 2005, at the height of the petrol crisis, Viktor Yushchenko publicly, sharply criticized Tymoshenko for “pressure on oil traders”.

References

External links
Prime Minister Yulia Tymoshenko presentation of the cabinet, official website of Yulia Tymoshenko (February 4, 2005)
Short biographies of ministers, European Parliament (February 4, 2005)

Ukrainian governments
1
2005 establishments in Ukraine
2005 disestablishments in Ukraine
Cabinets established in 2005
Cabinets disestablished in 2005